Earl of Kimberley, of Kimberley in the County of Norfolk, is a title in the Peerage of the United Kingdom. It was created in 1866 for the prominent Liberal politician John Wodehouse, 3rd Baron Wodehouse. During his long political career, he notably held office as Lord Lieutenant of Ireland, Secretary of State for the Colonies, Secretary of State for India and Secretary of State for Foreign Affairs. He was succeeded by his son, the second Earl. At first a Liberal like his father, he later joined the Labour Party, becoming the first Labour member of the House of Lords. His eldest son, the third Earl, represented Norfolk Mid in the House of Commons as a Liberal. Since 2002, the titles are held by the latter's grandson, the fifth Earl.

Background
The title of Baron Wodehouse, of Kimberley in the County of Norfolk, was created in the Peerage of Great Britain in 1797 for Sir John Wodehouse, 6th Baronet, of Wilberhall. He had previously represented Norfolk in Parliament. His son, the second Baron, sat as Member of Parliament for Great Bedwyn and Marlborough. He was succeeded by his grandson, the aforementioned third Baron (son of the Hon. Henry Wodehouse), who was created Earl of Kimberley in 1866.

The Wodehouse Baronetcy, of Wilberhall in the County of Norfolk, was created in the Baronetage of England in 1611 for Philip Wodehouse, previously Member of Parliament for Castle Rising. His son, the second Baronet, was Member of Parliament for Thetford. He was succeeded by his son, the third Baronet, who represented Thetford as well as Norfolk in the House of Commons. His grandson, the fourth Baronet, was also Member of Parliament for these constituencies. His son, the fifth Baronet, represented Norfolk in Parliament. He was succeeded by his son, the aforementioned sixth Baronet, who was elevated to the peerage in 1797.

Several other members of the Wodehouse family have also gained distinction. The author P. G. Wodehouse was the great-grandson of the Reverend Philip Wodehouse, second son of the fifth Baronet. The politician Edmond Wodehouse was the son of Thomas Wodehouse, third son of the fifth Baronet. His eldest son was the colonial administrator Sir Philip Wodehouse, Governor of Bombay from 1872 to 1877. Sir Philip Wodehouse's son Edmond Wodehouse represented Bath in the House of Commons as a Unionist. The Hon. Armine Wodehouse, younger son of the first Earl, was a civil servant and Liberal politician.

The family seat is Hailstone House, near Cricklade, Wiltshire.

Wodehouse Baronets, of Wilberhall (1611)
Sir Philip Wodehouse, 1st Baronet (d. 1623)
Sir Thomas Wodehouse, 2nd Baronet (c. 1585–1658)
Sir Philip Wodehouse, 3rd Baronet (1608–1681)
Sir Thomas Wodehouse (d. 1661)
Sir John Wodehouse, 4th Baronet (1669–1754)
William Wodehouse (c. 1706–1737)
Sir Armine Wodehouse, 5th Baronet (c. 1714–1777)
Sir John Wodehouse, 6th Baronet (1741–1834) (created Baron Wodehouse in 1797)

Barons Wodehouse (1797)

John Wodehouse, 1st Baron Wodehouse (1741–1834)
John Wodehouse, 2nd Baron Wodehouse (1770–1846)
The Hon. Henry Wodehouse (1799–1834)
John Wodehouse, 3rd Baron Wodehouse (1826–1902) (created Earl of Kimberley in 1866)

Earls of Kimberley (1866)
John Wodehouse, 1st Earl of Kimberley (1826–1902)
John Wodehouse, 2nd Earl of Kimberley (1848–1932)
John Wodehouse, 3rd Earl of Kimberley (1883–1941)
John Wodehouse, 4th Earl of Kimberley (1924–2002)
John Armine Wodehouse, 5th Earl of Kimberley (b. 1951)

The heir apparent is the present holder's only son, David Simon John Wodehouse, Lord Wodehouse (b. 1978)

References

Cited books

 

Earldoms in the Peerage of the United Kingdom

1611 establishments in England
Noble titles created in 1866
Earls of Kimberley